Mukhtolovo is an urban locality (a work settlement) in Ardatovsky District of Nizhny Novgorod Oblast, Russia, located  southwest of Nizhny Novgorod. Population:

References

Urban-type settlements in Nizhny Novgorod Oblast
Ardatovsky District, Nizhny Novgorod Oblast